The Charest River takes its source in Charest Lake, in the sector Montauban-les-Mines, in the extreme East of the municipality of Notre-Dame-de-Montauban, located in the Mekinac Regional County Municipality, in the administrative region of Mauricie in the province of Quebec, Canada. In the upper part, Charest River also drains the surrounding lakes: lake of the Mine, lake Perron, lake Perreault and lake End.

Agriculture is the main economic activity in the sector; recreational tourism activities, second; forestry, third.

The surface of the Charest River (except the rapids zones) is generally frozen from the beginning of December to the end of March, but the safe circulation on the ice is generally made from the end of December to the beginning of March.

Geography 
The Charest River flows south, crossing the rows St. Paul, St. Achilles and Sainte-Anne, in Saint-Ubalde and gradually goes away from the boundaries of the Lac-aux-Sables. In his course, going toward the boundary Saint-Ubalde and Saint-Adelphe, this river gets water from lakes Sainte-Anne and Perch. Then the river flows South-East (almost in parallel to the Batiscan River) and through 16 lots in the First Price Row in the Eastern section of Saint-Adelphe, where its course becomes very coil.

After descending the moraine more than a kilometer in the northeast row in the municipality of Sainte-Anne-de-la-Pérade, Charest River forks to 90 degrees to the right (southbound) entering Saint-Prosper-de-Champlain, moving towards the village, along the foot of the moraine. Then the river forks again 90 degrees to the left and passes through the agricultural zone lowlands of Saint-Prosper-de-Champlain, and goes to flow into the delta of the Sainte-Anne River near "Ile Rivard" (Rivard island), in the municipality of Sainte-Anne-de-la-Pérade. In its course of  Charest River drains a lot of farmland and forest areas especially in his journey through the moraine.

This shift has been diverting the course of the channel in a loop and altered the hydrological dynamics.

Gendron Creek 
From its source to the row Price in Saint-Adelphe (far eastern territory of Saint-Adelphe), Gendron stream follows a parallel course to the rivers Charest and Batiscan. After crossing straight rough and not conducive to agricultural land, Gendron creek descends the great moraine in a long crevice. His journey becomes very meander in the St. Lawrence plain through the village of Saint-Prosper-de-Champlain (northeast side), in First row St. Edward and row St. Elizabeth. Gendron stream reform constantly meandering channel and on the loamy bottom Lowlands St. Lawrence plain.

Gendron Creek flows into the Charest River, close to the mouth of the latter. In Saint-Prosper-de-Champlain, Edouard Creek is the main tributary of Gendron stream. The flow of Gendron stream is accentuated when the snow melts in the spring, it can also be temporarily after heavy rains. (Localisation of the mouth of the Gendron creek: 46 ⁰ 36 ' 13.07 North, -072 ⁰ 15' 29.24 West).

Toponymy 
The name Charest River was entered in the register of place names of the Commission de toponymie du Québec (Geographical Names Board of Québec) on December 5, 1968.

See also 

 Notre-Dame-de-Montauban
 Saint-Adelphe
 Saint-Prosper-de-Champlain
 Sainte-Anne-de-la-Pérade
 Lordship of Sainte-Anne-de-la-Pérade
 Lordship of Batiscan
 Sainte-Anne River
 Batiscan River
 Rivière à Veillet
 Lake Charest
 Mekinac Regional County Municipality
 Les Chenaux Regional County Municipality

References 

Rivers of Mauricie
Tributaries of the Saint Lawrence River